The Best Little Whorehouse in Texas is a 1982 American musical comedy film co-written, produced and directed by Colin Higgins (in his final film as director). It is an adaptation of the 1978 Broadway musical of the same name, and stars Burt Reynolds, Dolly Parton, Jim Nabors, Charles Durning, Dom DeLuise, Noah Beery Jr., Robert Mandan, Lois Nettleton, Theresa Merritt, Barry Corbin, Mary Jo Catlett and Mary Louise Wilson.

Durning was nominated for the Academy Award for Best Supporting Actor for his role as the Texas governor. Golden Globe Award nominations went to the film for Best Motion Picture (Comedy or Musical) and Parton for Best Actress in a Motion Picture (Comedy or Musical). It was the fourth highest-grossing live-action musical film of the 1980s, and the top grossing of 1982.

Plot
Ed Earl Dodd, the Sheriff of Lanville County, Texas, has a longstanding relationship with Miss Mona Stangley, who runs a brothel called the "Chicken Ranch" outside of the town of Gilbert in Ed Earl's jurisdiction. Illegal or not, Ed Earl does not interfere with her business, a fixture of the town since before World War I.

Occasionally interrupted by Deputy Fred Wilkins, the narrator, Ed Earl and Miss Mona have a pleasant arrangement as secret lovers. Almost everyone in town approves of Miss Mona, a public-minded citizen who regularly donates to charity and, except for her work, is decent and law-abiding.

Mayor Rufus P. Poindexter and insurance salesman/local townsman C.J. Vernon inform Ed Earl that consumer advocate and television personality Melvin P. Thorpe, originally from New Jersey, announced his intention to do an exposé about the Chicken Ranch. Visiting Thorpe in his Houston studio, Ed Earl is shocked by Thorpe's live telecast, in which Thorpe sensationally reveals to a huge audience that "Texas has a whorehouse in it." When Thorpe visits Gilbert to film, Ed Earl insults and threatens Thorpe in the town square after Thorpe accuses him of taking payoffs and bribes to protect Miss Mona's business.

The Chicken Ranch is such an institution that even the winner of the fabled football rivalry between the University of Texas Longhorns and the Texas A&M Aggies traditionally comes to "celebrate" its victory. Thorpe's negative publicity puts a spotlight on the place so Ed Earl asks Miss Mona to shutter the property until the TV attention subsides. She closes the bordello to her regular customers but allows the football players to have their victory party. Thorpe and his TV cameras infiltrate the property, break into the house, and catch the winning Aggies and a State Senator on tape in mid-debauch. Ed Earl and Miss Mona quarrel. She calls him a childish and insults his standing; in turn, Ed Earl tell Mona that "It's better than being a whore."

The Governor of Texas, who cannot decide on any issue until he first sees what voters say in opinion polls, listens to Ed Earl's eloquent appeal to keep the Chicken Ranch open. However, when the polls say a bare majority of Texans disapprove of the place, he orders Ed Earl to close it down. On his way out of the capital building, Ed Earl confronts a jubilant Thorpe and knocks him out with one punch as a camera crew films. He then calls Mona to tell her to close and apologize for their previous spat. The working girls sadly leave the Chicken Ranch immediately and permanently. Miss Mona is disconsolate, at least until learning what Ed Earl did to attempt to keep it open.

As Miss Mona is departing the Chicken Ranch for the last time, Ed Earl stops her and proposes. She turns him down, knowing that having a wife who had once run a whorehouse would hurt his chances of running for the state legislature. He insists that he wants to marry her, regardless of what people will think or say. To drive his point home, he picks up Miss Mona like a bride, installs her in the passenger seat of the pickup, and drives away.

In an epilogue, Deputy Fred, who succeeded Ed Earl as the Sheriff, states that Ed Earl and Miss Mona married and that Ed Earl successfully ran for the legislature, becoming a State Senator.

Cast

 Burt Reynolds as Sheriff Ed Earl Dodd
 Dolly Parton as Mona Stangley
 Dom DeLuise as Melvin P. Thorpe
 Charles Durning as The Governor
 Theresa Merritt as Jewel
 Jim Nabors as Deputy Fred Wilkins
 Lois Nettleton as Dulcie Mae
 Noah Beery Jr. as Edsel Mackey
 Robert Mandan as Senator Charles Wingwood
 Raleigh Bond as Mayor Rufus P. Poindexter
 Barry Corbin as C.J. Vernon
 Ken Magee as Mansel
 Mary Jo Catlett as Rita Crowell
 Mary Louise Wilson as Miss Modene Ennis
 Howard K. Smith as himself
 Donald F. Colson as Jeff Gerald
 Helen Kleeb as Dora 
 Mickey Jones as Henry
 Bobby Fite as Dulcie Mae's son
 Paula Shaw as Wulla Jean
 Kenneth White as Sheriff Jack Roy Wallace
 Ted Gehring as Sheriff Chapman
 Verne Lundquist as Football Announcer 
 Lee Grosscup as Football Color Man
 Alice Drummond as Governor's secretary
 Terri Treas as Chicken Ranch Girl: Taddy-Jo
 Randy Bennett as Privates Boy
 Andrea Pike as Chicken Ranch Girl: Shy (Speaking scenes cut)
 Valerie Leigh Bixler as Chicken Ranch Girl: Angel (Speaking scenes cut)

Production

Development
Originally, Larry L. King and Peter Masterson were going to write the screenplay and Masterson and Tommy Tune, who had directed the stage production, were to direct the film together. King recommended Shirley MacLaine, Dyan Cannon, Carlin Glynn and Jill Clayburgh as the possibles to star but was told they were not a sufficient box office draw.

When Dolly Parton was cast King suggested Willie Nelson as a co-star and Universal executives met with him but at the end Burt Reynolds was cast. Reynolds was paid $3.5 million and Parton $1.5 million.

Reynolds wanted script changes and wanted to sing. Universal became nervous about giving the film to first-time directors and ended up replacing Masterson and Tune with Colin Higgins.

Reynolds later said Parton "had two directors fired before we started – they were gone. Because I'd made so many movies and she hadn't, everyone thought it was me. Whether she was right or wrong in those decisions, it was amazing to me that she could do it."

Higgins prepared for directing it by watching old George Cukor films and Dr. Pepper commercials ("They have a lot of wonderful movement", said Higgins.)

Reynolds said he suggested to Higgins that Charles Durning be cast. "Colin is very smart, very commercial. They wanted Mickey Rooney, so I manipulated him a little. I told Colin, 'Mickey Rooney is a wonderful actor, but everyone knows that. You won't get any credit. Charles Durning can sing and dance and no one knows it, so you'll get all the credit.'"

Adaptation
The book of the play was restructured to make it a vehicle for Parton and Reynolds.

The plot is basically the same as that of the stage production, with one significant difference. In the original, Ed Earl and Miss Mona had a one-night stand 15 years earlier, but in the film, they maintain an ongoing affair.

The relationship in the film brings about not only the accusatory scene, when the sheriff—disappointed that Mona has broken her promise to close the Chicken Ranch down long enough for things to cool off—calls her a whore, but also the happy ending, when he proposes marriage to Mona, even though that might endanger his chances to be elected as a state legislator; the epilogue comments state that he is elected anyway.

Filming
Parton described her experience as "a nightmare." For his part, Reynolds described Parton as "very self-deprecating, at least in public."

Music

Much of Carol Hall's original Broadway score was performed in the adaptation. Eight songs, "Girl, You're a Woman", "Twenty-Four Hours of Lovin'", "Doatsy Mae", "The Anglette March", "The Bus from Amarillo", "No Lies", "Good Old Girl" and "Finale", were omitted. Two additional Parton compositions appear in the film: "Sneakin' Around", performed as a duet with Parton and Reynolds, and a two-stanza rendition of Parton's 1973 composition "I Will Always Love You". The film version of "I Will Always Love You" — the original recording had been a U.S. country chart-topper for Parton in the spring of 1974 — was released as a single in July 1982, and again reached number one on the U.S. country singles chart. It was also a mid-level hit on Billboard pop and adult contemporary charts. An altered version of Hall's "Hard Candy Christmas", in which Parton sings both the chorus and the verses of the song (as opposed to the film, which is partially sung by the brothel ladies), was also released as a single, reaching the top ten on the country singles chart in late 1982.

Parton wrote several new songs that were filmed but ultimately unused, including "A Gamble Either Way" and "Where Stallions Run". The former was restored for the ABC network television broadcast, as the film was too short for its time slot after the censors finished their edits and additional material was needed. "A Gamble Either Way" replaced "Girl, You're a Woman" and was sung by Parton after Mona interviewed "Shy" (Andrea Pike) for a job at the Chicken Ranch. The characters of Shy and Angel from the Broadway show were significantly reduced in the film; their footage was eventually edited out. "Down at the Chicken Ranch" was written for the trailer. Parton recorded two of the deleted songs, "A Gamble Either Way" and "A Cowboy's Ways" (a reworking of "Where Stallions Run"), and included them on her 1983 album Burlap & Satin.

Musical numbers
 "20 Fans"
 "A Lil' Ole Bitty Pissant Country Place"
 "Sneakin' Around"
 "Watchdog Report"
 "Texas Has a Whorehouse in It"
 "Texas Has a Whorehouse in It" (reprise)
 "The Aggie Song"
 "Courtyard Shag" (instrumental)
 "The Sidestep"
 "The Sidestep/Texas Has a Whorehouse in It" (reprise)
 "Hard Candy Christmas"
 "I Will Always Love You"

Release

Marketing
The film presented some difficulties for Universal, particularly with advertising. In 1982, the word "whorehouse" was considered obscene in parts of the United States, resulting in the film being renamed The Best Little Cathouse in Texas in some print ads, while television ads were either banned outright in some areas, or the offending word was censored; on WXYZ-TV in Detroit, the announcer on the station's "Now Showing" segment merely clicked his tongue to eliminate the offending word: "The Best Little [click, click] in Texas!" In Canada, the title was generally left alone in print, but televised trailers used a bleep censor over the word. During interviews, Parton sometimes referred to the film as The Best Little Chicken House in Texas.

Box office
The Best Little Whorehouse in Texas opened in 1,400 theaters on July 23, 1982 and earned $11,874,268 in its opening weekend, ranking number one in the United States box office, dethroning E.T. The Extra Terrestrials six-week run at the top of the box office. It was the biggest weekend for a musical film ever. The film grossed $69,701,637 domestically.

Critical reception
The film received mixed reviews from critics. On review aggregator website Rotten Tomatoes, the film holds a 42% rating based on 12 reviews. Roger Ebert of the Chicago Sun-Times gave the film two out of four stars, stating, "If they ever give Dolly her freedom and stop packaging her so antiseptically, she could be terrific. But Dolly and Burt and Whorehouse never get beyond the concept stage in this movie."

Cultural influence
The film and the original Broadway musical it was based on were spoofed in the 1982 pornographic film Memphis Cathouse Blues,  which starred Annette Haven in the Dolly Parton role of the madam and Mike Horner in the Burt Reynolds role as the sheriff. Porn star Kay Parker, who played one of the prostitutes in the film, had an uncredited bit role in The Best Little Whorehouse in Texas.

Legacy
The house used in the film is located at Universal Studios in Hollywood and can be viewed as part of the backlot tram tour. The inspiration for the set came from a real ranch house located outside Austin, Texas, which is featured in scenes from the movie.

The house was shown in the Ghost Whisperer television series episode "The Lost Boys".

The house was also featured in Rob Zombie's 2003 horror film House of 1000 Corpses.

The film was mentioned in an episode of The Venture Bros., where Dr. Venture mistakes it for a pornographic film, given its "racy" history.

References

Further reading
 Hall, Carol. Vocal Selections from The Best Little Whorehouse in Texas. Melville, N.Y.: MCA Music, 1979.
 King, Larry L. and Masterson, Peter. The Best Little Whorehouse in Texas. Music and lyrics by Carol Hall. French's Musical Library. New York, N.Y.: S. French, 1978. 
 King, Larry L. The Whorehouse Papers. New York: Viking Press, 1982.

External links
 
 
 
 

1982 films
1980s English-language films
1980s musical comedy films
American musical comedy films
American sex comedy films
Films scored by Patrick Williams
Films based on musicals
Films about prostitution in the United States
Films directed by Colin Higgins
Films set in Texas
Films shot in Texas
Films with screenplays by Colin Higgins
Universal Pictures films
1980s sex comedy films
1982 comedy films
1980s American films